This is a list of documented major crimes in Japan.

References

 https://archive.today/20150421000347/https://www.japantoday.com/smartphone/view/crime/sasebo-girl-who-killed-classmate-judged-criminally-responsible

Crimes
Japan
Major crimes